Evergestis spiniferalis is a species of moth in the family Crambidae. It is found in Russia and Uzbekistan.

The wingspan is about 29 mm. Adults are on wing from mid May to the beginning  of June and again in August in two generations per year.

References

Moths described in 1900
Evergestis
Moths of Europe
Moths of Asia